The Land and Environment Court of New South Wales is a court within the Australian court hierarchy established pursuant to the  to hear environmental, development, building and planning disputes. The Court’s jurisdiction, confined to the state of New South Wales, Australia, includes merits review, judicial review, civil enforcement, criminal prosecution, criminal appeals and civil claims about planning, environmental, land, mining and other legislation.

History

The Court was established on 1 April 1980 as the world's first environmental court that was also a superior court of record.

A Parliamentary review in 2001 noted "It is evident that there is some dissatisfaction within sections of the community about the role and operations of the Court".

Structure and jurisdiction

The Court is a superior court of record.  It consists of a Chief Judge, severals Judges, and Commissioners. The New South Wales Court of Criminal Appeal and the New South Wales Court of Appeal, both divisions of the Supreme Court of New South Wales, may hear appeals from the Court, depending on the nature of case. Appellants on constitutional issues may seek special leave for the matter to be heard before the High Court of Australia in certain circumstances.

Current composition
Judges have the same rank, title, status and precedence as the Judges of the Supreme Court of New South Wales. Judges preside over all Aboriginal land claims matters, most land tenure and compensation matters, and can hear matters in all other Classes of the Court’s jurisdiction.

The Judges, in order of seniority, are as follows:

Past Judicial officers and decision makers

Past Chief Judges

Former Judges 
The Honourable Justice Terry Sheahan 
The Honourable Justice Malcolm Craig
The Honourable Justice Peter Biscoe
The Honourable Justice Paul Stein
The Honourable Justice Neal Bignold
The Honourable Justice Angus Talbot - 1992 to 2007
The Honourable Justice David Lloyd
The Honourable Justice Jayne Jagot

See also

 List of New South Wales courts and tribunals
 Warden Court, a predecessor to the Land and Environment Court of New South Wales
 NSW Threatened Species Conservation Act 1995 (TSC Act)

References

External links
 

1980 establishments in Australia
New South Wales courts and tribunals
New South Wales
Environment of New South Wales
Courts and tribunals established in 1980